Claudine "Colo" Elizabeth O'Hagan Tavernier (30 July 1942 – 12 June 2020) was a British screenwriter.
Tavernier died on 12 June 2020 due to cancer.

Filmography

Film
1980 : Une semaine de vacances of Bertrand Tavernier
1984 : Un dimanche à la campagne of Bertrand Tavernier
1987 : La Passion Béatrice of Bertrand Tavernier
1988 : Une affaire de femmes of Claude Chabrol
1989 : Comédie d'été of Daniel Vigne
1990 : Daddy nostalgie of Bertrand Tavernier
1995 : Le Petit Garçon of Pierre Granier-Deferre
1995 : The Bait of  Bertrand Tavernier
2008 : Clara of Helma Sanders-Brahms
2017 : Paris la blanche de Lidia Terki

Television
1988 : Coup de pouce of Josée Dayan, in the series Sueurs froides
1989 : Le Bois de justice of Raymond Vouillamoz, in the series Haute Tension
1993 : Un pull par-dessus l'autre of Caroline Huppert
1995 : Charlotte dite 'Charlie' of Caroline Huppert, in the series Les Mercredis de la vie
1997 : Un arbre dans la tête of Jean-Pierre Sinapi
1999 : Chasseurs d'écume of Denys Granier-Deferre
2003 : Le Gang des poupées of Philomène Esposito
2003 : Papa, maman s'ront jamais grands of Jean-Louis Bertucelli
2004 : Une vie of Élisabeth Rappeneau
2007 : Les Jurés
2008 : La maison Tellier of Élisabeth Rappeneau
2011 : Joseph l'insoumis of Caroline Glorion

References

1942 births
2020 deaths
French screenwriters
French women screenwriters
British screenwriters
British women screenwriters